Magnus Gustafsson was the defending champion, but did not participate this year.

Wayne Ferreira won the tournament, beating Andrea Gaudenzi in the final, 6–3, 6–3.

Seeds

Draw

Finals

Top half

Bottom half

References

 Main Draw

1995 Dubai Tennis Championships
1995 ATP Tour